Mentor is a former railroad depot located on Station Street in Mentor, Ohio. The station opened in 1890. A defunct New York Central freight house is located across the tracks from the depot. The depot is currently open and used by a restaurant. Mentor station is on the National Register of Historic Places as the Lake Shore and Michigan Southern RR Depot and Freight House.

History
The passenger depot was opened in 1890 by the Lake Shore and Michigan Southern Railway, replacing an older depot on the same line. The station was acquired by the New York Central Railroad after merging with the LS&MS in 1914. Passenger service to Mentor ended in 1949.

Deekers Side Tracks (alternatively known as Deekers Bar & Grille) opened in August 2007. Deekers is the latest in a string of restaurants to be located in the old depot.

Train derailment
On June 21, 1905 at 9:05pm, an eastbound LS&MS-operated 20th Century Limited train hit an open switch near the depot. The resulting crash destroyed the old freight depot, and caused the deaths of 21 people on the train.

Following the destruction of the LS&MS freight depot, a new freight house was built in 1909.

References

External links 
LAKE COUNTY Railroad Depots

Railway stations in the United States opened in 1890
Former railway stations in Ohio
Former New York Central Railroad stations
Railway stations closed in 1949
1890 establishments in Ohio
1949 disestablishments in Ohio
Railway accidents and incidents in Ohio